The glandular branches of the facial artery (submaxillary branches) consist of three or four large vessels, which supply the submandibular gland, some being prolonged to the neighboring muscles, lymph glands, and integument.

References 

Arteries of the head and neck